Mary Ann Akers is a freelance writer and adjunct professor of journalism at American University. She was a blogger and reporter for The Washington Post, a national correspondent for NPR and a political gossip columnist for Roll Call newspaper, appearing on CNN, MSNBC, ABC News and other networks to talk about her coverage of Congress and politics. She has written for Politico , the Huffington Post and other outlets.

Her spouse is investigative journalist Michael Isikoff. They have a son, born in 2009.

References

Sources
 http://www.huffingtonpost.com/mary-ann-akers
 http://blog.washingtonpost.com/sleuth/2007/01/bio_of_mary_ann_akers.html

External links
 https://web.archive.org/web/20071212043202/http://blog.washingtonpost.com/sleuth/

American women columnists
American gossip columnists
Living people
Guilford College alumni
Place of birth missing (living people)
Year of birth missing (living people)